Evan Michael Engram (born September 2, 1994) is an American football tight end for the Jacksonville Jaguars of the National Football League (NFL). He played college football at Ole Miss and was drafted by the New York Giants with the 23rd pick in the first round of the 2017 NFL Draft.

Early years
Engram attended and played high school football at Hillgrove High School.

College career
Engram was a consensus first-team All-SEC selection. In his four-year career at Ole Miss, he made 162 receptions for 2,320 yards, a 14.3 yard average. He had 15 career touchdowns. He netted five catches for 176 yards, including an 83-yard reception, in the 2014 Egg Bowl. In his last year at Ole Miss, on 65 receptions, Engram netted 926 yards and eight touchdowns, a performance that earned him the Conerly Trophy.

College statistics

Professional career
Engram received an invitation to the Senior Bowl and practiced well during the week. He helped the South defeat the North 16–15 and made one catch for ten yards. He attended the NFL Scouting Combine and completed all the required combine drills. On April 3, 2017, he participated in Ole Miss's pro day and chose to only perform positional drills and stand on his combine performance. NFL draft experts and analysts projected him to be a first or second round pick in the draft. He was ranked the second best tight end in the draft by Sports Illustrated and was ranked the third best tight end prospect by ESPN, NFLDraftScout.com, Mike Mayock, and Bucky Brooks.

New York Giants
The New York Giants selected Engram in the first round (23rd overall) of the 2017 NFL Draft. He was the second tight end to be selected in the draft, after O. J. Howard was selected 19th overall by the Tampa Bay Buccaneers. Engram was selected to upgrade a Giants tight end core that only had three touchdown receptions the previous year. On June 15, 2017, the Giants signed Engram to a four-year, $10.71 million contract that includes a signing bonus of $5.93 million and is fully guaranteed.

2017 season
Throughout training camp, he was slated to take the vacant starting tight end role that used to belong to Larry Donnell. Head coach Ben McAdoo officially named him the starting tight end to start the 2017 regular season.

He made his professional regular season debut and first career start in the New York Giants' season-opener against the Dallas Cowboys and made four receptions for 44 yards in their 19–3 loss. His first career reception came on a three-yard pass by Eli Manning on the first pass of the game in the first quarter before being tackled by Cowboys' linebacker Sean Lee. On September 18, 2017, Engram caught four passes for 49 yards and a touchdown in a 24–10 loss to the Detroit Lions on Monday Night Football.His first career touchdown reception came in the second quarter on an 18-yard pass from Eli Manning.  On December 3, 2017, Engram caught seven passes for a season-high 99 receiving yards and a touchdown during a 24–17 loss at the Oakland Raiders. This marked his sixth and last touchdown of the season. Head coach Ben McAdoo was fired after the game due to the Giants posting a 2–10 record. In Week 15, he made a season-high eight receptions for 87 yards and had his first carry of his career for a 14-yard gain as the Giants lost 34–29 to the Philadelphia Eagles. He was inactive for the Giants' 18–10 victory over the Washington Redskins in Week 17 after he suffered a rib injury the previous week. He finished the season with 64 receptions for 722 receiving yards and six touchdowns in 11 starts and 15 games.

2018 season
In his second professional season, Engram finished with 45 receptions for 577 receiving yards and three receiving touchdowns in 11 games. He missed some time due to a MCL injury and foot injury.

2019 season

Engram recorded his first career 100-yard game in a Week 1 35–17 loss to the Dallas Cowboys with 11 receptions, 116 yards, and a touchdown. In Week 3 against the Tampa Bay Buccaneers, Engram caught six passes for 113 yards and a 75-yard touchdown as the Giants won 32–31, catching the first career NFL touchdown from rookie Daniel Jones. On December 17, Engram was placed on injured reserve with a foot injury after missing the last five games. He finished the season with 44 catches for 467 yards and three touchdowns through eight games.

2020 season
On April 29, 2020, the Giants picked up the fifth-year option on Engram's contract., worth $6.013 million fully guaranteed for the 2021 season.

On October 22, 2020, against the Philadelphia Eagles, Engram dropped a critical pass from Daniel Jones on third-and-six at the Eagles 25 yard line ahead of the two-minute warning in the fourth quarter. This forced the Giants to punt and lose 21–22 despite the Giants leading 21–16 at the time of Engram's drop. In Week 12 against the Cincinnati Bengals, he had six receptions for 129 receiving yards in the 19–17 victory.

Despite being named to his first career Pro Bowl with 63 receptions for 654 yards and a touchdown, Engram struggled during the season with eleven drops which led to three turnovers and cost the Giants a pair of touchdowns.

2021 season
After missing the first two games of the season due to a calf injury, Engram struggled in 2021, and finished the season with 46 receptions for 408 yards and scored three touchdowns in 15 games. Towards the end of the season, he was utilized more as a blocking tight end than a receiver.

Jacksonville Jaguars
On March 16, 2022, Engram signed a one-year, $9 million contract with the Jacksonville Jaguars. In Week 8, Engram scored his first touchdown as a Jacksonville Jaguar in a 21-17 loss to the Denver Broncos. In a 36-22 win in week 14 against the Tennessee Titans, Engram caught a career-high 162 yards on eleven catches with two of those catches going for touchdowns. In Week 16 against the New York Jets, he had seven receptions for 113 receiving yards in the 19–3 victory. He finished the 2022 season with 73 receptions for 766 receiving yards and four receiving touchdowns.

In the Wild Card Round of the playoffs, Engram recorded seven receptions for 93 receiving yard and one receiving touchdown in the 31–30 victory over the Los Angeles Chargers.

On March 6, 2023, the Jaguars placed the franchise tag on Engram.

NFL career statistics

Regular season

New York Giants franchise records
Most touchdowns in a season by a rookie tight end (6)

Personal life
Engram's sister, Mackenzie Engram, played for the University of Georgia Lady Bulldogs basketball team.

References

External links

Jacksonville Jaguars bio
Ole Miss Rebels bio 

1994 births
Living people
African-American players of American football
People from Powder Springs, Georgia
Sportspeople from Cobb County, Georgia
Players of American football from Georgia (U.S. state)
American football tight ends
Ole Miss Rebels football players
New York Giants players
21st-century African-American sportspeople
National Conference Pro Bowl players
Jacksonville Jaguars players